Schloss Wasserhof is a privately owned building in Gneixendorf, near Krems an der Donau in Lower Austria. It is known particularly as the property in the early 19th century of Nikolaus Johann van Beethoven, brother of Ludwig van Beethoven; the composer stayed here at one time.

History
The present building dates from around 1550.

Nikolaus Johann van Beethoven
In 1819 Nikolaus Johann van Beethoven acquired the property.

In autumn 1826, his brother Ludwig van Beethoven visited him. During his stay the composer wrote the finale to his String Quartet Op. 130, the last music he completed. It was a replacement, composed at the suggestion of his publisher, of the Große Fuge, the original finale. He began the piece in September, and sent the manuscript to his publisher on 22 November 1826; he left Gneixendorf soon afterwards.

21st century
In recent years the building has been restored by the present owner, the architect Ernst Linsberger.

References

Castles in Lower Austria
Krems an der Donau
Ludwig van Beethoven
Baroque castles in Austria